Methodist Episcopal Church of Burlington, also known as "Old Burlington Church," is a historic Methodist Episcopal church located on US 6 at Township Road 357 in West Burlington, Bradford County, Pennsylvania.  It was built in 1822, and is a two-story, rectangular frame front gabled building. It measures 30 feet by 45 feet. The interior features an elevated octagonal pulpit. Surrounding the church is a contributing cemetery.

It was added to the National Register of Historic Places in 1989.

References

Churches on the National Register of Historic Places in Pennsylvania
Churches completed in 1822
19th-century Methodist church buildings in the United States
Churches in Bradford County, Pennsylvania
Methodist churches in Pennsylvania
National Register of Historic Places in Bradford County, Pennsylvania
1822 establishments in Pennsylvania